Carol Lynn Maillard (born 1951) is an American actress, singer, and composer. She is one of the founding members of the Grammy Award-winning a cappella ensemble Sweet Honey in the Rock.

Early life and education
Born and raised in Philadelphia, Maillard was a student of the GESU SCHOOL in Philadelphia and also graduated from John W. Hallahan Catholic Girls' High School. She graduated from The Catholic University of America with a major in theater in 1973.

Career

Stage and Screen
Maillard has acting credits that include roles on Broadway (Eubie!, Comin' Uptown, Beehive); Off-Broadway (in several Negro Ensemble Company productions like Zooman and the Sign, and in New York Shakespeare Festival productions); television (For Colored Girls Who Have Considered Suicide When the Rainbow Is Enuf, Hallelujah!); and film (Beloved, Thirty to Life). Much of her career has involved participating in works that are Afro-centric and steeped in African American orality, as well as uplift and support of Black culture

Music
She is a founding member of the group Sweet Honey in the Rock, and has composed and arranged many of that group's songs. Maillard has described the creation of that group as something connecting to the social movements of the time, but also equally inspired by contemporary experimental theater and contemporary popular music. That group has been nominated for a Grammy multiple times, won a Grammy Award for their contribution to the Smithsonian Folkways A Vision Shared album, and have won multiple Washington Area Music Awards Wammies Most of her solo compositions are published via 4 Jagelish Music.

In addition to composing and performing with Sweet Honey in the Rock, she has also been a guest vocalist for other artists, including Horace Silver and Betty Buckley.

Personal life
Maillard has a son, Jordan Maillard, who is also a Los Angeles-based musician. He appears with her in the documentary Sweet Honey in the Rock: Raise Your Voice

References

External links

Carol Lynn Maillard at Internet Off-Broadway Database

1951 births
Living people
20th-century African-American women singers
American musical theatre actresses
American women singers
American sopranos
Musicians from Philadelphia
Catholic University of America alumni
American film actresses
American television actresses
Actresses from Philadelphia
Singers from Pennsylvania
Sweet Honey in the Rock members
21st-century African-American people
21st-century African-American women